Leptostomia is a genus of long-beaked pterosaur from the mid-Cretaceous (?Albian-Cenomanian) of Morocco, North Africa. The type species is L. begaaensis, which was named and described in 2021 from sediments of the Kem Kem Group in Morocco. It was a small animal with a long, slender bill which is thought to have been used to probe sediments for worms and other invertebrates, similar to kiwi birds and curlews. Leptostomia is likely a member of the Azhdarchoidea.

Etymology
In 2021, paleontologists Roy E. Smith, David Michael Martill, Alexander Kao, Samir Zouhri and Nicholas R. Longrich named the pterosaur species Leptostomia begaaensis. The generic name is a combination of the Ancient Greek leptos (meaning "slim"), and stoma (meaning "mouth"). The specific name refers to the oasis village Hassi El Begaa, near the Aferdou N 'Chaft site where the pterosaur was found.

Discovery
The holotype specimen of Leptostomia, FSAC-KK 5075, was found in a layer of a river deposit of the Ifezouane Formation of the Kem Kem Group in Morocco. The age of which is uncertain, but it is believed to date back to the Cenomanian or perhaps Albian stages of the middle Cretaceous, about 112-94 million years ago. The holotype consists of part of the upper beak, located in front of the nasoantorbital fenestra. Specimen FSAC-KK 5076, a second fossil of the species, and the paratype specimen of Leptostomia, consists of the anterior part of the dentary symphysis. The preserved portion of the lower jaws may have lain in front of the holotype rostrum according to the authors' interpretation, with some overlap. The specimens of Leptostomia were examined by means of a CT scan.

Description
Leptostomia was a small, long-beaked animal with adaptations for sediment probing. The holotype consists of two beak fragments. The fragments of Leptostomia were mostly flat, and had thick walls, unusual for a pterosaur.

The jaws  are toothless and slightly upcurved, and taper gradually toward the front. The jaws were also strongly flattened. The upper jaw had a narrow ridge, similar to that seen in many other pterosaurs, which would have occluded with a groove in the lower jaw.

Classification 
Smith et al. suggest that Leptostomia was a pterodactyloid, and likely a member of the clade Azhdarchoidea, but its affinities remain unclear because of the fragmentary nature of the fossils. Because no pterosaurs closely resembling Leptostomia have been described before, it is unclear whether it belongs to a known family such as Azhdarchidae or Chaoyangopteridae, or represents a new azhdarchoid clade.

Paleobiology
The beak of Leptostomia is unlike that of any previously described pterosaurs. Instead, it closely resembles birds that feed by probing in sediment, such as kiwis, ibises, hoopoes and snipes. These birds typically feed on invertebrates such as earthworms (in soil) or polychaete worms, fiddler crabs, or bivalves (in estuarine or marine intertidal settings). Leptostomia's prey could have been sought by a sensitive system of nerve endings capable of detecting movement at a distance.

References

External links
 The Kiwi Pterosaur - by Nick Longrich

?
Albian life
Cenomanian life
Cretaceous pterosaurs of Africa
Cretaceous Morocco
Fossils of Morocco
Fossil taxa described in 2021